Lyndon James Stevens (25 October 1940 – 1 September 2020) was an Australian cricket umpire. He stood in one ODI game in 1979. He was the first Tasmanian to umpire in a full international cricket match.

See also
 List of One Day International cricket umpires

References

1940 births
2020 deaths
Australian One Day International cricket umpires
People from Tasmania